Charles Cavendish may refer to:
Sir Charles Cavendish (landowner, born 1553) (1553–1617), English landowner
Sir Charles Cavendish (Nottingham MP) (1594–1654), English politician, son of the above
Charles Cavendish (general, died 1643) (1620–1643), English Royalist general, great-nephew of Sir Charles Cavendish (1553–1617)
Charles Cavendish, Viscount Mansfield (1626–1659), English Royalist politician, grandson of Sir Charles Cavendish (1553–1617)
Lord Charles Cavendish (1704–1783), English politician, great-great-nephew of Charles Cavendish (1620–1643)
Charles Cavendish, 1st Baron Chesham (1793–1863), English politician, great-great-nephew of the above
Charles William Cavendish (1822–1890), English Anglican priest, later Catholic convert and secretary of the Society for the Propagation of the Faith
Charles Cavendish, 3rd Baron Chesham (1850–1907), English politician, grandson of the 1st Baron Chesham
Lord Charles Arthur Francis Cavendish (1905–1944), English nobleman, great-great-nephew of the 1st Baron Chesham
Charles Cavendish, 7th Baron Chesham (born 1974), English nobleman, great-great-grandson of the 3rd Baron Chesham
Doctor Charles Cavendish, the main antagonist of Arkham Asylum: A Serious House on Serious Earth

See also
Charles Cavendish Boyle (1849–1916), English colonial administrator, 1879–1911
Cavendish (disambiguation)